Sparkle Hayter (born 1958) is a Canadian journalist and author. In 1995 she received the Arthur Ellis Award (Best First Crime Novel) of the Crime Writers of Canada for her novel What's A Girl Gotta Do? (1995). In 1998, she became the first winner of the UK's Sherlock award for "Best Comic Detective." Hayter has also performed as a stand-up comedian.

Early life and education
Hayter was born in Pouce Coupe, British Columbia and grew up in Edmonton, Alberta. Her father was Ron Hayter, the longest-serving city councillor of Edmonton, Alberta. In 1982, she graduated in film and television production from New York University.

Career
Among other things, she worked for CNN in Atlanta, New York, and Washington, for WABC in New York City and CIII-TV in Toronto. At the time of the Afghan civil war, she moved to Pakistan and then went along with the Mujahedin to Afghanistan, reporting for the Toronto Star. After this, she decided to give up journalism as a career. After her return to the U.S. she married and began a career as a comic and a writer. She moved briefly to Tokyo, then on her return to New York divorced and went to live in the famous Chelsea Hotel.

In 1993, she published her first novel, What's a  Girl Gotta Do?, the first in the Robin Hudson series, which proved her breakthrough. In a starred review, Publishers Weekly called it "flat-out funny, audacious, and a little bit weird, Hayter stakes out territory all her own." She wrote pieces for the New York Times Op-Ed Page, The Nation and The Globe and Mail, was a regular participant on CNN's talk show "CNN & Company" and 'also appeared on Good Day New York, NPR, CBC, BBC and Paris Premiere. In late 2001 she moved to Paris, where she joined the Kilometer Zero arts cooperative and lived in the In Fact art squat. In 2007-2008, she began working in Bollywood, where she bought Indian films for a Canadian movie network and produced video promos and interviews to support the programming for "Bollywood Saturday Night."

In 1995, she received the Arthur Ellis Award (Best First Crime Novel) of the Crime Writers of Canada for her novel What's A Girl Gotta Do?. In 1998, she became the first winner of the UK's Sherlock Award for "Best Comic Detective." She went on publish two more novels and numerous stories and essays.

Hayter has also performed as a stand-up.

Works

Robin Hudson series

 1994: What's A Girl Gotta Do?
 1996: Nice Girls Finish Last
 1997: Revenge of the Cootie Girls 
 1998: The Last Manly Man
 2000: The Chelsea Girl Murders 
 2005: Last Girl Standing

Other novels

 2002: Naked Brunch
 2004: Bandit Queen Boogie

See also
 Tart Noir
 Katy Munger

References 

1958 births
Living people
Canadian crime writers
Canadian newspaper journalists
Canadian women journalists
Canadian women non-fiction writers
Journalists from Alberta
Journalists from British Columbia
People from the Peace River Regional District
Tisch School of the Arts alumni
Canadian expatriates in Pakistan
Women mystery writers
Writers from Edmonton